First Second Books is an American publisher of graphic novels. An imprint of Roaring Brook Press, part of Holtzbrinck Publishers, First Second publishes fiction, biographies, personal memoirs, history, visual essays, and comics journalism. It also publishes graphic non-fiction for young readers, including the Science Comics and History Comics collections, and for adults, including the World Citizen Comics, a line of civics graphic books, and biographical works such as The Accidental Czar.

Authors and artists published by First Second include Ben Hatke, Gene Luen Yang, Jillian Tamaki, Vera Brosgol, Jen Wang, Shannon Hale, LeUyen Pham, and Japanese director Hayao Miyazaki.

First Second is headed by editorial director Mark Siegel.

History
First Second launched in U.S. stores and online in May 2006. It was distributed by Macmillan in the rest of the English-speaking world. After the merger in 2010, Macmillan distributes all of the books.

In 2006, First Second published American Born Chinese by Gene Luen Yang, the first graphic novel ever nominated for a National Book Award, and the first ever to win the American Library Association's Edward L. Printz Award. 

In 2015, First Second published This One Summer by cousins Jillian and Mariko Tamaki, the first book in any format ever nominated as a finalist for both the American Library Association's Randolph Caldecott Award, and the American Library Association's Edward L. Printz Award.

Series 
Some of First Second's biggest hits include the InvestiGators series and the Real Friends trilogy.

Series published by First Second include:

 The Adventure Zone graphic novel series
 The Dam Keeper by Robert Kondo and Daisuke Tsutsumi
 Delilah Dirk, by Tony Cliff
 Demon, by Jason Shiga
 Cucumber Quest, by Gigi D.G.

Selected titles

Before 2010 
American Born Chinese, by Gene Luen Yang

Laika, by Nick Abadzis

Prince of Persia, by Jordan Mechner, A.B. Sina, LeUyen Pham, and Alex Puvilland

The Photographer, by Emmanuel Guibert

2010s 
Friends with Boys by Faith Erin Hicks
Boxers and Saints by Gene Luen Yang
The Cute Girl Network, by Greg Means and M. K. Reed, with art by Joe Flood.
This One Summer by Mariko Tamaki and Jillian Tamaki
The Divine by Boaz Lavie, Asaf Hanuka, Tomer Hanuka
Spinning by Tillie Walden
 The Hunting Accident by David Carlson and Landis Blair
Check, Please!: #Hockey by Ngozi Ukazu
 Speak by Laurie Halse Anderson and Emily Carroll
The Prince and the Dressmaker by Jen Wang

References

External links
 
 First Second Blog
 
 

 
Comic book publishing companies of the United States

Holtzbrinck Publishing Group